The 1987–88 Copa del Rey was the 86th staging of the Copa del Rey. The trophy was won by FC Barcelona after beating defending champions Real Sociedad 1–0 in the final.

First round

Second round

Third round

|}
Bye: Sestao Sport Club

Fourth round

|}
Bye: UE Figueres, Racing de Santander

Round of 32

|}

First leg

Second leg

Round of 16

|}

First leg

Second leg

Quarter-finals

First leg

Second leg

Semi-finals 

|}

First leg

Second leg

Final

References

External links 

  RSSSF
  Linguasport

Copa del Rey seasons
Copa